Iodobenzene dichloride (PhICl2) is a complex of iodobenzene with chlorine. As a reagent for organic chemistry, it is used as an oxidant and chlorinating agent.

Chemical structure
Single-crystal X-ray crystallography has been used to determine its structure; as can be predicted by VSEPR theory, it adopts a T-shaped geometry about the central iodine atom.

Preparation
Iodobenzene dichloride is not stable and is not commonly available commercially. It is prepared by passing chlorine gas through a solution of iodobenzene in chloroform, from which it precipitates. The same reaction has been reported at pilot plant scale (20 kg) as well.

Ph-I + Cl2 → PhICl2

An alternate preparation involving the use of chlorine generated in situ by the action of sodium hypochlorite on hydrochloric acid has also been described.

Reactions
Iodobenzene dichloride is hydrolyzed by basic solutions to give iodosobenzene (PhIO) and is oxidized by sodium hypochlorite to give iodoxybenzene (PhIO2).

In organic synthesis, iodobenzene dichloride is used as a reagent for the selective chlorination of alkenes. and alkynes.

References

Further reading
 

Iodanes
Oxidizing agents
Reagents for organic chemistry
Phenyl compounds